Vigilant Guardian may refer to:

 Operation Vigilant Guardian, an operation of the Belgian army in 2015
 Global Guardian, an annual training exercise sponsored by the United States Strategic Command with Air Force Space Command and NORAD